Higgins Beach is a small beach located in the state of Maine in the United States. It is located in the town of Scarborough in Cumberland County. The beach is north of Prouts Neck and Old Orchard Beach and south of Crescent Beach State Park.

It lies between bedrocks at the southwest, sometimes known as Thunder Cove, and the Spurwink River on the northeastern end. This small seaside community has about 300 cottages. In addition, the community has two inns (The Breakers and the Higgins Beach Inn) which are open during the summer season.

Higgins Beach is most known for its family-oriented oceanside neighborhood, striped bass fishing, the beach's quaintness, the shipwreck embedded in the beach's sands, and surfing.

The beach has had public access for as long as the town has record, but with very little public parking.  In 2010, the town of Scarborough purchased a small parking lot accommodating approximately 75 vehicles. Higgins Beach has managed to retain at least some of its small-town characteristics, something that larger beaches in the area such as Old Orchard have lost in return for commercialization and tourism. However, residential gentrification has taken place in the neighborhood steadily since the early 2010's, with numerous new and affluent homes recently appearing in the community. However, the vast majority of the neighborhood still survives on the small number of families who have owned property in the area or otherwise returned year after year for decades. Some of its current residents began coming to Higgins Beach in this way.

References
 Higgins Beach Geological Survey

External links

 Higgins Beach Association

Geography of Cumberland County, Maine
Beaches of Maine
Scarborough, Maine
Landforms of Cumberland County, Maine